Agonopterix liesella is a moth in the family Depressariidae. It was described by Viette in 1987. It is found in Madagascar.

References

Moths described in 1987
Agonopterix
Moths of Madagascar